The 2015 Dubai Duty Free  Darts Masters was the third staging of the tournament organised by the Professional Darts Corporation. It was the first World Series of Darts event of 2015. The tournament featured the top six players according to the Order of Merit, plus two wildcards, competing in a knockout system. The tournament was held at the Dubai Tennis Centre in Dubai over 28–29 May 2015.

Michael van Gerwen was the defending champion after he retained his 2014 title last year by defeating Peter Wright 11–7 in the final. He maintained his unbeaten run in the event to win it for the third time with an 11–8 victory over Phil Taylor in the final.

Prize money
The total prize fund was AED750,000.

Qualifiers
The top six players on the PDC Order of Merit after the 2015 World Championship qualified for the event (with the top 4 seeded). They were joined by two wildcards. These were:

  Michael van Gerwen (Winner)
  Phil Taylor (Runner-up)
  Gary Anderson (Semi-finals)
  Adrian Lewis (Semi-finals)
  Peter Wright (Quarter-finals)
  James Wade (Quarter-finals)

Wildcards:
  Stephen Bunting (Quarter-finals)
  Raymond van Barneveld (Quarter-finals)

Draw

Broadcasting
The tournament was available in the following territories on these channels.

References

Dubai Duty Free Darts Masters
Dubai Duty Free Darts Masters
2015 in Emirati sport
World Series of Darts